Kaveinga Faʻanunu (July 30, 1962 – July 24, 2011) was a Tongan politician

Having a Bachelor of Science degree in Forestry, he worked for nine years in various "forestry, agroforestry and managerial" positions in the government's forestry department, before going into politics. This included working for a time as chief executive officer of Tonga Timber, a government-owned company.

His brief career in national politics began when he was elected People's Representative for the ninth constituency of Tongatapu in the November 2010 general election. Standing as a candidate for the Democratic Party of the Friendly Islands, he obtained 34% of the vote, seeing off fourteen other candidates.

He died seven months later, on July 24, 2011, of "head and neck cancer", at Vaiola Hospital in Nukuʻalofa.

References

1962 births
2011 deaths
Members of the Legislative Assembly of Tonga
Deaths from cancer in Tonga
Democratic Party of the Friendly Islands politicians
People from Tongatapu
Deaths from throat cancer